"Hot Water" is a single released in 1984 by the English jazz-funk band Level 42. It was released a couple of weeks before the band's studio album True Colours (1984). The single reached #18 on the UK Singles Chart and was a top ten hit in the Netherlands and Norway. The song was produced by Ken Scott.

In 1985, "Hot Water" and another True Colours song, "The Chant Has Begun", were tacked onto the US version of Level 42's breakthrough studio album, World Machine, in place of "I Sleep on My Heart," "Dream Crazy" (which only appeared on the European CD version of the album), and "Coup d'état".  "Hot Water" was released as the US follow-up single to the World Machine breakthrough single, "Something About You" in 1986; it peaked at #87.

B-sides
The B-sides of the 1984 releases featured the title track of the Level 42 album, Standing in the Light (1983), which was their latest studio album when the single was released. This song was produced by Larry Dunn and Verdine White, both members of Earth, Wind & Fire. The Canadian releases of 1985, featured "The Chinese Way", produced by Mike Vernon, and "Kansas City Milkman", produced by Ken Scott, as B-sides. On the 1986 US release "Dream Crazy" was on the B-side, produced by Level 42 and Wally Badarou. The live version that appears on the US 12" release is the same version released on A Physical Presence (1985).

Track listings 
All songs written and composed by Mark King, Mike Lindup, Phil Gould and Wally Badarou, except where noted.

7" vinyl 
 UK: Polydor / POSP 697
 Netherlands: Polydor / 881 262-7

 US: Polydor / 885 155-7  (1986)

12" vinyl 
 UK: Polydor / POSPX 697

 Australia, Germany Netherlands: Polydor / 881 262-1

 Canada: Polydor / POLSX 117 (1985)

 Canada: Polydor / DJP 191 (Promo, 1985)

 US: Polydor / 885 155-1  (1986)

Charts

Weekly charts

Year-end charts

References

External links
 

1984 singles
1984 songs
Level 42 songs
Songs written by Mark King (musician)
Songs written by Phil Gould (musician)
Songs written by Mike Lindup
Songs written by Wally Badarou
Song recordings produced by Ken Scott
Polydor Records singles